Henhouse Henery is a 1949 Warner Bros. Looney Tunes theatrical short directed by Robert McKimson. The cartoon was released on July 2, 1949, and features Foghorn Leghorn, Henery Hawk and the Barnyard Dawg.

It is the first Foghorn Leghorn cartoon featuring Stephen Foster's "Camptown Races", a song that would be featured in every Foghorn Leghorn cartoon following this with the exceptions of A Fractured Leghorn, Of Rice and Hen and Banty Raids.
When shown on Boomerang USA, this short plays in PAL audio.

Plot
The story beginning with Henery Hawk on a quest to catch a chicken. In the barnyard, Foghorn is tormenting the Dawg, first by setting a fake fire which causes Dawg to run up a ladder and over it, then by stuffing a ball in the Dawg's mouth to silence him. Henery, seeing Foghorn, hits him on the head with a hammer, then does it again a second time. When Henery tells Foggy that he wants to catch a chicken, the much larger Foggy advises him to "start small and work up." Henery tries to remove a hen (and her egg) from the barnyard, but is stopped by Foghorn.

As Henery contemplates his next move, Foggy lures the Dawg out of his house with a folderol (a jester's head on a stick), and when the Dawg reaches the rope limit, Foghorn paints his tongue green. Foggy spots Henery and points him to a duck and her ducklings, telling Henery that they are chickens. Henery follows the ducks into the water and almost drowns until Foggy saves him. Foghorn then paints a fence to make it appear as if a gate is open, and spanks the Dawg with a stick in order to get the Dawg to chase him. The Dawg falls for the trap, but then confronts Foggy at the end of the fence, the Dawg having removed his collar. While he is being chased, Foggy chops down a tree and carries it into a workshop to fashion it into a baseball bat. He barely has time to admire his work before the Dawg shoves him aside and seizes the bat from Foghorn and chases him, but Foggy escapes by hiding in a trash can.

Once he eludes the Dawg, Foghorn sees Henery and tells him to find a young chicken that is still in his shell, and directs Henery to a nearby turtle, who rebuffs Henery's attempt to catch him. The Dawg, still carrying the baseball bat, sees Henery and they scheme to lure Foggy with a fake chicken trap, which is a rope tied to a tree. Foggy falls for the ruse, saying that the trap can be avoided by a "smart chicken." Foggy then gets caught in the real trap which is a hole next to the fake trap. Henery ties a rope around Foghorn's neck and releases the tree trap which causes Foghorn to be flung into the ground several times. The story concludes with Henery pulling Foggy away by the neck, stating (to the audience), "I don't want I say I don't want a smart chicken, I want him" and humming De Camptown Races.

References

External links

1949 animated films
1949 short films
1949 films
Looney Tunes shorts
Warner Bros. Cartoons animated short films
Films directed by Robert McKimson
Films scored by Carl Stalling
1940s Warner Bros. animated short films
1940s English-language films
Foghorn Leghorn films
Henery Hawk films
Barnyard Dawg films